Futball Club Hatvan is a professional football club based in Hatvan, Heves County, Hungary, that competes in the Nemzeti Bajnokság III, the third tier of Hungarian football.

Name changes
?–1950: Hatvani Cukorgyári SE
1950–51: Hatvani ÉDOSz
1951–80: Hatvani Kinizsi SK
1980: merger with Hatvan Spartacus SK
1980–90: Hatvani Kinizsi Vasutas Sport Club
1990–91: Hatvani DEKO SE
1991–92: Hatvani Kinizsi Vasutas Sport Club
1992–present: Futball Club Hatvan

Honours
Nemzeti Bajnokság III:
Winner: 2000–01

External links
 Profile on Magyar Futball

References

Football clubs in Hungary
Association football clubs established in 1992
1992 establishments in Hungary
Heves County